The Outdoor Survival Handbook is a 1992 survival book by Ray Mears. First published as The Complete Outdoor Handbook; The book is divided into four sections, one for each season with chapters on clothing, survival skills and tools for each. Includes illustrations by Paul Bryant.

References

Books by Ray Mears
Survival manuals
1992 non-fiction books